The Great Eastern Railway (GER) Class Y14 is a class of 0-6-0 steam locomotive.  The LNER classified them J15.

The Class Y14 was designed by T.W. Worsdell for both freight and passenger duties - a veritable 'maid of all work'. Introduced in July 1883, they were so successful that all the succeeding Locomotive Superintendents continued to build new batches up until 1913 with little design change, the final total being 289. During World War I, 43 of the engines served in France and Belgium.

Background

On 10–11 December 1891, the Great Eastern Railway's Stratford Works built one of these locomotives and had it in steam with a coat of grey primer in 9 hours 47 minutes; this remains a world record. The locomotive then went off to run  on Peterborough to London coal trains before coming back to the works for the final coat of paint.

Because of their light weight the locomotives were given the Route Availability (RA) number 1, indicating that they could work over nearly all routes.

Accidents and incidents
On 25 September 1900, locomotive No. 522 suffered a boiler explosion at Westerfield, Suffolk.
On 7 January 1927, locomotive No. 7613 was hauling a freight train that was in collision with a lorry at Roudham Heath, Norfolk, on the Breckland Line due to errors by the crossing keeper. The lorry driver was killed.
On 4 October 1929, locomotive No. 7938 was hauling a freight train that departed against a danger signal at Tottenham, London and was subsequently stopped foul of a junction. Both crew abandoned the locomotive before an express passenger train was in collision with it.
In the late 1950s, No.65475 had to be rerailed by crane due to an unknown cause and location.
On 17 November 2018, locomotive No. 564 struck a vehicle on a level crossing near Sheringham in Norfolk. The driver of the Mercedes involved in the collision ignored the warning lights at the crossing and proceeded through into the path of the oncoming locomotive, which was travelling at around 10 mph at the time. The collision reportedly occurred at around 11:30 AM.

Notable features
As built all the locomotives had a stovepipe chimney; this was replaced in LNER days by a cast chimney with a small lip. The original Worsdell and early Holden series had three-ring boilers with the steam dome placed in the middle. Also the Worsdell boilers had a flat grate, however from 1890 Holden developed a boiler with a sloping grate and a two-ring telescopic barrel with the dome located well forward. The advantage of the dome position was a short 5½ inch steam pipe which limited pressure drop between the boiler and the cylinders. This boiler was adopted as standard and persisted on all Great Eastern Locomotives down to 1898; from then on it was perpetuated on the smaller locomotives as long as these remained essentially in their original configuration - which could be down to the 1960s.
 
As with all Great Eastern classes, the Y14 had a cab with a low wooden roof covered with canvas sealed by a coat of lead paint. This was replaced in LNER days by a higher arched sheet metal roof. Some engines had special side window cabs for service on the exposed Brightlingsea and Colne Valley branches.

Allocations
On 1 January 1923 there were 272 J15 locomotives in existence. They were allocated as follows:
 Cambridge: 48
 Colchester: 14
 Ipswich: 32
 King's Lynn: 5
 Lincoln: 3
 Lowestoft: 7
 March: 17
 Norwich: 36
 Parkeston: 2
 Peterborough East: 19
 Stratford: 91
 Yarmouth: 4

In 1942 during World War II, six locomotives were drafted into to assist with coal traffic in South Yorkshire with three allocated to Mexborough engine shed and three to Barnsley engine shed.

On 1 January 1948 when British Railways was formed, there were 127 J15 locomotives in existence.

Unusually, in 1957 a couple of the class were allocated to Aylesbury and worked freight trains on the former Great Western Railway branch from Princes Risborough to Watlington before being withdrawn in 1958.

In film
In September 1936 locomotives 7541 and 7835 were withdrawn by the LNER and sold to London Film Productions for their film Knight Without Armour. The two locomotives were moved to Denham film studios and underwent cosmetic modification to look more Russian as that was where the film was set. The locomotives were then sold to the War Department and worked on the Shropshire and Montgomeryshire Railway as WD221 and WD212. During their war service both were involved in incidents and returned to Stratford in 1944 and subsequently scrapped.

Another member of the class appeared in the 1954 film Happy Ever After disguised as an Irish locomotive.

Preservation 

Number 564/7564/65462 is preserved on the North Norfolk Railway and owned by the Midland and Great Northern Joint Railway Society. In 2002 the locomotive reached the end of a major overhaul and was painted in LNER (numbered 7564) and BR black numbered 65462) liveries for the duration of its boiler ticket. It originally operated in these liveries when classified as a J15 in LNER and BR days. Following withdrawal from service in 2013, the locomotive received another overhaul (completed 2015) where it was outshopped in GER lined blue and sporting its original number of 564 and representing its days when classified as a Y14.

65469 was originally a candidate for preservation, but it was scrapped.

Models 
Hornby produces a ready-to-run model of the J15 in 00 gauge (4 mm) in BR (with the rebuilt high-arched cab roof) and LNER liveries (both as-built and high-arch cab roofs). Also in 00 gauge, there are kits from Alan Gibson and Nu-Cast. Finley and Smith produce a 3 mm kit.  A 7mm (O gauge) kit is made by Connoisseur Models.

References

External links

 Y14 Class 0-6-0 1883-1892, 1899, 1906, 1912-1913 — Great Eastern Railway Society

0-6-0 locomotives
Y14
Railway locomotives introduced in 1883
Sharp Stewart locomotives
Railway Operating Division locomotives
Standard gauge steam locomotives of Great Britain
Freight locomotives